Mr. Zhou Live Show is a Chinese television live talk show hosted by stand-up comedian Zhou Libo. It was originally broadcast by Phoenix Television and Dragon Television in 2010 and by Zhejiang Television after 2012.

Like his stand-up, Zhou does not have scripts or notes, creating his own material through improvisation. The show also includes guest interviews and Zhou dropped his Shanghai dialect to have a more accessible audience.

References

Chinese television talk shows
Chinese television shows
2010 Chinese television series debuts
Phoenix Television original programming